USS Shiloh (CG-67) is a  guided missile cruiser of the United States Navy, named in remembrance of the Battle of Shiloh during the American Civil War. She was built at the Bath Iron Works in Bath, Maine.

With her guided missiles and rapid-fire cannons, she is capable of facing and defeating threats in the air, on or under the sea, and ashore. She also carries two Seahawk LAMPS multi-purpose helicopters, mainly for anti-submarine warfare, (ASW).

History

1990s
On 3 September 1996, while in the  carrier battle group, Shiloh launched six Tomahawk cruise missiles in Operation Desert Strike against Iraq.

2000s
She deployed with the Battle Group again in July 2002, and was among the first cruisers to launch missiles in Operation Iraqi Freedom.  In March 2003 Shiloh was assigned to Cruiser-Destroyer Group Three. The Shiloh returned to her homeport San Diego, California on 25 April 2003, ending an unusually long nine-month deployment.

In January 2005, she participated in Operation Unified Assistance, rendering aid to those who suffered from the 26 December 2004 tsunami off the coast of Aceh, Indonesia. Shiloh was one of the first American ships to arrive on scene.

On 22 June 2006, a Standard Missile Three (or SM-3) launched from Shiloh intercepted a multi-stage ballistic missile launched from the Pacific Missile Range Facility at Barking Sands, Hawaii.

In August 2006, she arrived on station at Yokosuka Naval Base in Yokosuka, Japan, replacing , as part of a joint U.S.-Japanese ballistic missile defense program.

On 8 July 2009, Petty Officer 1st Class Christopher Geathers fell from the ship's fantail into Tokyo Bay while rigging shore power cables. A two-and-a-half-day search failed to locate Geathers and he was declared missing and later was declared dead. A Navy investigation, led by Rear Admiral Kevin Donegan, commander of Task Force 70, found that the accident was preventable, in part because Shiloh personnel had observed Geathers working without proper safety equipment, but had failed to intervene. Nevertheless, the report did not recommend disciplinary action against any of the ship's crewmembers.

2010s
In June 2017, a gas turbine systems technician named Peter Mims thought to have been lost at sea was found after seven days hiding in the engine room. Following the Mims incident, several sailors contacted the Navy Times about severe morale problems on the ship to which they attributed the Mims incident. The Navy Times requested "command climate surveys" through a Freedom of Information Act request.

These surveys, completed voluntarily by sailors on the ship, reported extensive morale problems universally blamed on the CO, Captain Adam M. Aycock.  Among the complaints were widespread depression and suicidal tendencies, a dysfunctional ship that sailors felt was ill-prepared for combat, an overworked and deeply stressed crew, and a constant worry of extreme punishment for minor infractions. Sailors were dismayed that despite a significant number of the ship's crew filing severely critical complaints of Aycock's leadership in the command climate surveys, the only action taken by the Navy was to counsel him. Capt. Aycock was relieved of command after completing his full 26-month tour.

2020s

In December 2020 the U.S. Navy's Report to Congress on the Annual Long-Range Plan for Construction of Naval Vessels stated that the ship was planned to be placed Out of Commission in Reserve in 2024.

Awards
Shiloh has earned the following awards during her service life:
 Battle Efficiency E Awards for: 2013 & 2021

In popular culture
 The ship is featured prominently in the 2012 naval thriller, Fire of the Raging Dragon, by Don Brown.

References

External links

 
 
 
 
 
 
 
 

 

Ticonderoga-class cruisers
Ships built in Bath, Maine
1990 ships
Cruisers of the United States